"Thunder in My Heart" is a song by English-Australian singer Leo Sayer, from his fifth studio album, Thunder in My Heart (1977). The song was written by Sayer and Tom Snow, while produced by Richard Perry. It was released through Warner and Chrysalis Records in 1977, as the first single from the album. The disco song consists of a bassline and strings. "Thunder in My Heart" received generally positive reviews from music critics, who praised the production. It peaked at number 22 on the UK Singles Chart and at number 38 on the US Billboard Hot 100. A dance remix of the song by British disc jockey Meck titled "Thunder in My Heart Again" was released on 6 February 2006, and topped the UK Singles Chart.

Composition
Musically, "Thunder in My Heart" is a disco song. It contains a bassline performed by Abraham Laboriel on the bass guitar, accompanied with strings and vocals. Sayer and Tom Snow wrote the song, which was produced by Richard Perry. Snow plays the piano, with drums and congas performed by Jeff Porcaro and Lenny Castro respectively. Fred Tackett and Lee Ritenour uses the guitars, as Bobbye Hall utilises a tambourine.

Critical reception
Writing for the Red Deer Advocate, J. Norman Bower stated that "Thunder in My Heart" is a "classic Sayer melody" followed with instrumentals, while Warren Gerds of the Green Bay Press-Gazette opined that the song has a "big sound" due to the production.

Commercial performance
In Australia, "Thunder in My Heart" peaked at number 11 on the Kent Music Report, where it was ranked at the number 93 position on the 1977 year-end chart. The song debuted at number 32 on the New Zealand Singles Chart dated 11 December 1977. It peaked at number 21 on the chart issued 29 January 1978, and remained for four weeks. "Thunder in My Heart" bowed at number 22 on the UK Singles Chart dated 2 October 1977, where it remained for eight weeks. The song peaked at number 38 on the US Billboard Hot 100 chart issued 5 November 1977. On the Canadian RPM Top 100 Singles chart issued 19 November 1977, "Thunder in My Heart" charted at number 35.

Credits and personnel
Credits adapted from the liner notes of Thunder in My Heart.

Recording
 Recorded at Studio 55 (Los Angeles, California)

Personnel

 Leo Sayer vocals, songwriting
 Tom Snow songwriting, piano
 Richard Perry producer
 Jeff Porcaro drums
 Abraham Laboriel bass 
 Fred Tackett guitar
 Lee Ritenour guitar 
 Lenny Castro congas 
 Bobbye Hall tambourine 
 Gene Page string arrangements, conductor 
 Howard Steele recording, remix engineer
 Helen Silvani second engineer
 Allen Zentz mastering

Charts

Weekly charts

Year-end charts

"Thunder in My Heart Again"

Background and release
A remix of "Thunder in My Heart" by British disc jockey Meck titled "Thunder in My Heart Again" was released on 6 February 2006, which featured Sayer's vocals. In 2005, Meck asked Sayer for permission to remix the song, after the former found it as a 12-inch single inside a Los Angeles discount store and envisioned a "dance mix treatment". Sayer opined that Meck completely altered the sound but "kept all of its integrity", concluding that he could not discover anything wrong with Meck's version.

"Thunder in My Heart Again" is a dance song, which contains a sample of "Thunder in My Heart" by Leo Sayer. It was performed, produced and arranged by Meck, with mixing by Peter Craigie.

Commercial performance
"Thunder in My Heart Again" debuted at the number one peak on the UK Singles Chart dated 12 February 2006, 28 years after "Thunder in My Heart" originally charted on the same chart. It was Meck's first single on the chart to debut at the number one position dated 18 February 2006, and was Sayer's second number one song on the chart at the age of 57 years, 8 months. It was eventually certified silver by the British Phonographic Industry (BPI) on 22 July 2013, for selling 200,000 equivalent units. The song also debuted at the peak of the Scottish Singles Chart dated 12 February 2006. "Thunder in My Heart Again" peaked at number 16 on the Australian ARIA Singles Chart, where it remained for 17 weeks.

Credits and personnel
Credits adapted from the back cover of "Thunder in My Heart Again".

Recording
 Features a sample from and is an adaptation of "Thunder in My Heart" by Leo Sayer.

Personnel
 Meck performer, producer, arrangement
 Peter Craigie mixing

Track listing

Charts and certifications

Weekly charts

Year-end charts

Certifications

Release history

References

1977 songs
1977 singles
2006 debut singles
Songs written by Tom Snow
Songs written by Leo Sayer
Leo Sayer songs
Number-one singles in Scotland
UK Singles Chart number-one singles
Island Records singles